The French 16th Army Corps was a French military unit created in November 1870 by the vice admiral Fourichon, which fought in the Franco-Prussian War, the First and Second World War.

Commanders

Franco-Prussian War 
 13 October 1870 : Général d'Aurelle de Paladines
 17 October 1870 : Général Pourcet d'Arnéguy
 2 November 1870 : Général Chanzy
 5 December 1870 : Amiral Jauréguiberry

World War I
 30 October 1913 : Général Taverna
 7 November 1914 : Général Grossetti
 13 January 1917 : Général Herr
 30 April 1917 : Général Corvisart
 26 August 1918 : Général Deville

World War II 
 
1939 - 1940 : Général Fagalde

016
016
Military units and formations established in 1870
Military units and formations disestablished in 1940
Corps of France in World War I